The Auld Alliance (Scots for "Old Alliance";) was an alliance between the kingdoms of Scotland and France against England made in 1295. The Scots word auld, meaning old, has become a partly affectionate term for the long-lasting association between the two countries. Although the alliance was never formally revoked, it is considered by some to have ended with the signing of the Treaty of Edinburgh in 1560. 

The alliance played a significant role in the relations among Scotland, France and England. The alliance was renewed by all the French and Scottish monarchs of that period except Louis XI. By the late 14th century, the renewal occurred regardless of whether either kingdom was at war with England at the time.

The alliance began with the treaty signed by John Balliol and Philip IV of France in 1295 against Edward I of England. The terms of the treaty stipulated that if either country were attacked by England, the other country would invade English territory. The 1513 Battle of Flodden, where the Scots invaded England in response to the English campaign against France, was one such occasion. Thomas Randolph, Earl of Moray, negotiated the renewal of the alliance in 1326. The alliance played an important role in the Wars of Scottish Independence, the Hundred Years' War, the War of the League of Cambrai, and the Rough Wooing.

History

Birth of the Auld Alliance 
The dynastic turmoil caused by the death in 1290 of Scotland's seven-year-old queen, Margaret, the Maid of Norway, left the covetous Edward I of England with an opportunity to assert his authority over Scotland. In response, the Council of Twelve, which had taken over the government of Scotland temporarily, sought alliances wherever they could be found. Phillip IV declared England's possession of Gascony forfeit in 1294, bringing France and England close to war. Alliance with France was a clear course for Scotland to take. In October 1295, a Scottish embassy to France agreed to the Treaty of Paris, which was signed on 23 October.

As with all subsequent renewals of what became the Auld Alliance, the treaty favoured France. The French were required to do no more than continue their struggle against the English in Gascony. The cost of any war between Scotland and England was to be borne entirely by the Scots. Nevertheless, Scotland, as remote and impoverished as it was, was now aligned to a major European power. Even if they were more symbolic than actual, the benefits of the alliance mattered greatly to Scotland.

In the short term, however, the treaty proved to be no protection against Edward, whose swift and devastating invasion of Scotland in 1296 all but eradicated its independence. Furthermore, the cessation of hostilities between England and France in 1299, followed by the treaty of "perpetual peace and friendship," allowed Edward to devote all of his attention and forces to attacking the Scots. In the end, Scotland owed its eventual survival to the military acumen and inspiration of Robert the Bruce and the mistakes of Edward II, rather than to its bond with France. In 1326, Robert the Bruce renewed the alliance with the Treaty of Corbeil. The motive for this renewal was precautionary: neither realm seemed to have much to fear from England at the time.

Hundred Years War 
However, this changed after 1330, when Edward III set out to complete his conquest of Scotland and to reassert his power in France. For the first time, the Franco-Scottish alliance acquired a sense of emergency. In 1346, Edward overwhelmed French forces at the Battle of Crécy. Two months later, David II of Scotland was captured at the Battle of Neville's Cross, during an invasion of Northern England. His 11-year absence as Edward's prisoner only increased the internal turmoil and power struggles of Scotland. David II was forced to make a deal with Edward III to gain his freedom. After his release in 1357, David successfully consolidated royal power in Scotland and cut down the power of the barons who opposed him with the help of Archibald Douglas, 3rd Earl of Douglas.

The accession of pro-French Robert II led to immediate renewal in 1371, with the embassy of the Bishop of Glasgow and the Lord of Galloway to France. The treaty was signed by Charles V at the Château de Vincennes on 30 June, and at Edinburgh Castle by Robert II on 28 October. The benefits to Scotland were mixed. In 1385, plans were drawn up for a Franco-Scottish invasion of England. This included dispatching a small French force to Scotland, for the first time. These plans were never acted on: The French invasion failed to materialise. The deteriorating relations between France and Scotland were summed up by the French chronicler Jean Froissart when he "wished the King of France would make a truce with the English for two or three years and then march to Scotland and utterly destroy it".

However, necessity had driven the two kingdoms together and the need to resist aggressive new Lancastrian kings kept the alliance together in the 15th century. In 1418, with France on the brink of surrendering to the forces of Henry V, the Dauphin, Charles VII, called on his Scottish allies for help. Between 1419 and 1424, as many as 15,000 Scottish troops were sent to France.

French and Scottish forces together won against the English at the Battle of Baugé in 1421. It marked the turning point of the Hundred Years War, but the victory was short-lived for Scotland. The Scots army was defeated at Verneuil in 1424. Despite this defeat, the Scots had given France a valuable breathing space, effectively ensuring the continued power of the French state.

In 1429, Scots came to the aid of Joan of Arc in her famous relief of Orléans. Scottish soldiers also served in the Garde Écossaise, the loyal bodyguard of the French crown. Many members of the Scottish expeditions to France chose to settle there. Some officers were granted lands and titles in France. In the 15th and 16th centuries, they became naturalised French subjects. Through the rest of the 15th century, the alliance was formally renewed four times, until the eventual victory of France in the Hundred Years War.

Wars of the Roses 

The aftermath of the Hundred Years War in England that led to the Wars of the Roses meant that the English threat was greatly reduced, thus rendering the alliance almost obsolete. Scotland and France at first saw England's turmoil as an opportunity to carry out raids without opposition. But Scotland went further by seeing this as its chance of retaking Roxburgh and Berwick in 1460. Despite their victory of capturing Roxburgh, it unfortunately cost King James II's life. While the regents reigned Scotland until King James III was old enough to rule, Margaret of Anjou made a compromise by giving Berwick to Scotland in 1461 in exchange that they would aid the Lancastrian cause in the war. Scotland agreed and together they gained their victory in the Battle of Wakefield with the death of Richard of York. Margaret of Anjou made a similar compromise the same year with Scotland's ally, France by giving them Jersey in exchange for support for the Lancastrian cause and thus, the Auld Alliance in a way was engaging in a war that they've caused by their own victory in the Hundred Years War. 

The true reasoning for the alliance's existence is to fight against the English, not end up aiding one side in their enemy's own civil war. Their reason being was that the Yorkist had sided with the Burgundian State, and with the Yorkists on the throne meant that the English would return to fight France through Burgundy. Neither France nor Scotland had the stomach to fight after the Hundred Years War that the former was recovering from. To prevent England from becoming strong enough to fight against them, the allies created a proxy war out of it by siding with their former enemy in the last phases of the Hundred Years War, and Yorkists enemy, the Lancastrians. Not wanting a repeat of Wakefield when Henry VI and Margret fled to Scotland in 1464, Edward IV made a peace with Scotland with the Treaty of York. That peace however was short lived because once the Yorkists won the war and exterminated the Lancastrians, the Yorkists managed to regain England's lost possessions of Jersey from France in 1468 and Berwick from Scotland in 1482. Around the same time, with the Treaty of Arras, the Burgundy threat to France was subdued. After the Lancastrians became extinct, Henry Tudor had since been in exile in Brittany, he made attempts to take the throne but failed. But when he went to exile in France to escape pro-Yorkists supporters, Henry was able to gain French and Scottish support from King Charles VII of France. Together, they landed in Wales and with Welsh allies defeated the Yorkist King Richard III at the Battle of Bosworth Field in 1485. When Henry VII married Elizabeth of York, it ended England's turmoiled war and began its gradual recovery with the Tudor Dynasty. To maintain peace with the Franco-Scottish alliance as the sixteenth century began, Henry VII gave to marriage his eldest daughter, Margaret Tudor to James IV of Scotland and his younger daughter, Mary Tudor to Louis XII of France. The former's lineage would inevitably give rise to the joint ruler of both Scotland and England in 1603, King James VI & I, 43 years after the Auld Alliance was abolished.

Reformation and decline 
It underwent a dramatic revival when it was formally reviewed in 1512 and again in 1517 and 1548. Scotland still suffered badly following the death of James IV and most of his nobles at Flodden in 1513. Periodic Anglo-French and Anglo-Scottish conflict throughout the sixteenth century continued, but the certainties that had driven the Auld Alliance were disappearing. As Protestantism gained ground in Scotland, more and more people favoured closer links with England than with France.

In 1558, the alliance between the two kingdoms was revived with the marriage of Mary, Queen of Scots to the future Francis II of France, but it lasted only until 1560 when Francis died prematurely.<ref>{{cite journal| author-first=Eric| author-last=Durot| title=Le crépuscule de lAuld Alliance. La légitimité du pouvoir en question entre Ecosse, France et Angleterre (1558–1561)| journal=Revue d'histoire moderne et contemporaine| year=2007| issue=1| pages=3–46| url=http://www.cairn.info/article.php?ID_ARTICLE=HES_071_0003&DocId=43872&hits=21+| access-date=26 May 2015| archive-date=27 May 2015| archive-url=https://web.archive.org/web/20150527004738/http://www.cairn.info/article.php?ID_ARTICLE=HES_071_0003&DocId=43872&hits=21+| url-status=live}}</ref> At the same year of the marriage, the French successfully retook their last position of Calais and driven the English off the continent once and for all from ever retaking it in 1563. In order to make England recognise France's claim over Calais, they gave Queen Elizabeth I 120,000 crowns as a barter. After Mary's exile to England in 1568, Scotland was transformed into a Protestant nation by its new king, James VI, who was also heir to the English throne. His desire to form close ties with England, and England's complete removal from the French mainland after Calais, meant that the alliance had outlived its usefulness. In the 1560s, after more than 250 years, formal treaties between Scotland and France were officially ended by the Treaty of Edinburgh. With the Scottish Reformation, Scotland was declared Protestant, and allied itself with Protestant England instead. During the Reformation, the Protestant Lords of the Congregation rejected the Auld Alliance and brokered English military support with their treaty of Berwick, aimed against the French Regent Mary of Guise. Two hundred Scottish soldiers were sent to Normandy in 1562 to aid the French Huguenots in their struggle against royal authority during the French Wars of Religion.

After the treaty of Edinburgh

Although abolished, the Auld Alliance still lived on with the Catholic Scots. Throughout the seventeenth century since the House of Stuart acquired the English throne, aside from the Wars of the Three Kingdoms and Oliver Cromwell's short-lived Commonwealth, relations between England and Scotland, including France for the most part, was neutral. That all changed in the Williamite War when the Stuart Catholic King James VII and II was deposed in favour of the Protestant William of Orange, husband to James's eldest daughter, Mary II. After losing in Ireland, and Scotland before the century came to a close, James went into exile in France, and through his lineage there would try to retake the crown with their Catholic Scots and French backed allies in the Jacobite Wars throughout the early and mid eighteenth century, with the closest from Bonnie Prince Charlie getting as far south as Swarkestone Bridge near Derby before retreating back to Scotland. After Culloden in 1746 and the Highland Clearances soon after, some of the exiled Jacobites in the New World aided their French ally in the Seven Years' War, even on the side of the Patriots in the American War of Independence, an echo to when the Auld Alliance started almost 500 years ago. The Garde Écossaise, since their founding in 1418 continued to protect the kings of France until 412 years later in 1830, when Charles X of France abdicated. In 1848, France abolished the monarchy after restoring it in 1815 after the French Revolution and the Napoleonic War, and once more became a Republic under Napoleon III.

 Wider influence 
The Auld Alliance extended into the lives of the Scottish population in a number of ways, affecting architecture, law, the Scots language, and cuisine, among other things. Scottish soldiers served within the French army; there were reciprocal dual nationality agreements; and France granted privileges to Scottish vintners. Many Scots studied at French universities, something which continued up until the Napoleonic Wars. David de Moravia, the 14th-century Bishop of Moray, helped found the Scots College of the University of Paris in 1333. Among those who studied or taught at French Universities were: the poets John Barbour and George Buchanan; the historian Hector Boece; the founder of St Andrews University, Henry Wardlaw; the founder of Aberdeen University, William Elphinstone; the founder of the Advocates Library, George Mackenzie, and the noted translator of Rabelais, Sir Thomas Urquhart. Scottish castles built with French construction in mind include Bothwell and Kildrummy.

 Legacy 

In a speech which he delivered in Edinburgh in June 1942, Charles de Gaulle described the alliance between Scotland and France as "the oldest alliance in the world". He also declared that:

In every combat where for five centuries the destiny of France was at stake, there were always men of Scotland to fight side by side with men of France, and what Frenchmen feel is that no people has ever been more generous than yours with its friendship.

In 1995, celebrations were held in both countries marking the 700th anniversary of the beginning of the alliance.

After extensive research, British historian Siobhan Talbott concluded that the Auld Alliance had never been formally revoked and that it endured and thrived long after the Acts of Union in 1707 and the Entente Cordiale of 1904.

 See also 
 France–United Kingdom relations
 Duke of Aubigny
 Duke of Lennox
 Foreign alliances of France
 Treaty of Edinburgh, 1560, brought a century of peace among Scotland, France and England
 Tudor period, English responses

 References 

 Citations 

 Sources 
 Michel, F.X., Les Écossais en France, les Français en Écosse II vols. London 1862. (in French)  

 Further reading 
 James Higgins, "Scotland's Stewart Monarchs".
 Norman Macdougall. An Antidote to the English: The Auld Alliance, 1295–1560  (2001) 
 Pollock, M. A. Scotland, England and France After the Loss of Normandy, 1204–1296: 'Auld Amitie (Boydell & Brewer Ltd, 2015)
 Talbott, Siobhan. An alliance ended? Franco-Scottish commercial relations, 1560–1713 (PhD Dissertation, University of St Andrews, 2011)

External links 
 Royal document listing payments to many of the Scottish contingents
 French Institute website

 
1290s establishments in Scotland
1290s establishments in France
1295 establishments in Europe
1560 disestablishments in Europe
1290s treaties
13th-century military alliances
14th-century military alliances
15th-century military alliances
16th-century military alliances